The 2012–13 Bosnia and Herzegovina Football Cup was the 18th season of Bosnia and Herzegovina's annual football cup, and a 13th season of the unified competition.  The winner qualified for the second qualifying round of the 2013–14 UEFA Europa League.

The defending champions Željezničar – having won their 5th title the previous year by defeating Široki Brijeg in the final with an aggregate score of 1–0 – were not able to defend their title with Široki Brijeg being the new champions after a 2–2 aggregate score claiming the title only after penalties (5–4 for Široki Brijeg). This is their second cup title.

All top 16 clubs entered from the round of 32.

Participating clubs
The following 32 teams competed in Round of 32 (the club in bold is the champion):

1 Of the 32 participants, the Federation of Bosnia and Herzegovina has 21 clubs, while the Republika of Srpska has 11. Brčko District has no representatives.

Calendar

Draw
The draws for the round of 32 were conducted in Sarajevo at 12:00 (CEST) on 6 September 2012 in hotel "Park", Vogošća. All 32 clubs were in the same pot, resulting that every club could get any other club as his opponent. The first-drawn team served as the host. Also, the date for the matches was decided to be on 19 September 2012.

It was announced on 20 September that the draw for round of 16 will be conducted on 25 September 2012 at 12:00 (CEST) in hotel "Art", Sarajevo. The 16 clubs who advanced from round of 32 were set in the same pot making every fixture possible and unlike the previous round, this time the club who advance further will be decided by a two-legged fixture. The matches initially were scheduled for 03 and 17 October 2012, but the second leg was later rescheduled for 24 October, because the Bosnia and Herzegovina national football team played on 16 October.

The draws for quarterfinals were done on 30 October at 12:00 CEST in the halls of Football Federation of Bosnia and Herzegovina in Sarajevo. The draw was absolute, which means every fixtures was possible and, just like the last round, the club who proceeds to the semifinals was decided by a two-legged fixture. The date for the matches was decided to be on 07 and 21 November 2012.

The draw for semifinals took part after the winter break, on 5 March 2013 at 12:00 CET in the halls of Football Federation of Bosnia and Herzegovina in Sarajevo. Once again, there were no seeding which made every fixture possible. The teams who will play in the finals will be decided by a two-legged fixture with the first leg on 13 March and the second one on 3 April 2013.

Competition

Round of 32
This round consisted of 16 single-legged fixtures. All 32 clubs entered the competition from this round, while the matches were scheduled for 19 September 2012, with one match on 18 September.  In a case of a draw in the regular time, the winner was determined with a penalty shootout.

Note: Roman numerals in brackets denote the league tier the clubs participate in during the 2012–13 season.
Source: SportSport.ba

 one leg only
 penalties used if needed, no extra-time

Round of 16
The 16 winners continued their way to the final through this round. Unlike the last round, this round consisted of 8 two-legged fixtures. The dates for the matches were determined with the draw which was held on 25 September, while the matches took place on 03 and 24 October 2012.

|}
1 Roman numerals in brackets denote the league tier the clubs participate in during the 2012–13 season.
Source: SportSport.ba

two legs
away goals rule applied if score is level after 180 minutes
penalties used if needed, no extra-time

First leg

Second leg

Quarterfinals
The eight winners from the previous round met their new opponents in this round on the way to the final. This round consisted of 4 two-legged fixtures. The date for the matches were determined with the draw which was held on 30 October with the first match taking place on 6 November, while the rematch was scheduled two weeks after, on 21 November 2012.

|}
1 Roman numerals in brackets denote the league tier the clubs participate in during the 2012–13 season.
Source: NFSBiH

two legs
away goals rule applied if score is level after 180 minutes
penalties used if needed, no extra-time

First leg

Second leg

Semifinals
The four winners from the previous round played their opponents in this last hurdle before the final. The semifinals consisted of two two-legged fixtures. The first leg took part on 13 March, while the second leg was played on 3 April 2013.

|}
1 Roman numerals in brackets denote the league tier the clubs participate in during the 2012–13 season.
Source: NFSBiH

two legs
away goals rule applied if score is level after 180 minutes
penalties used if needed, no extra-time

First leg

Second leg

Final

The final will be contested between Željezničar and Široki Brijeg on 30 April and 14 May 2013.

|}

Source: NFSBiH

 two legs
 away goals rule applied if score is level after 180 minutes
 penalties used if needed, no extra-time

First leg

Second leg

Top goalscorers

 Players/clubs in italic are out of the competition.

Media coverage

Only from quarter-finals and onward selected matches will be broadcast in Bosnia and Herzegovina by BHT1.

These matches will be or were broadcast live on television:

See also
2012–13 Premier League of Bosnia and Herzegovina
Football Federation of Bosnia and Herzegovina

References

External links

facebook

Soccerway

worldfootball

 
Bosnia and Herzegovina Football Cup seasons
2012–13 in Bosnia and Herzegovina football
2012–13 domestic association football cups